Hamoud Al-Jaifi (born  1918 - died 22 March 1985), was a Yemeni politician, diplomat and military officer. He served as Prime Minister of the Yemen Arab Republic from 29 April 1964 to 6 January 1965, under President Abdullah as-Sallal.

Biography 
Al-Jaifi was born in 1918 in Wadi Dhahr village in Hamdan, Sana'a. He grew up and studied basic education in Sana'a. In 1935 he join Iraq Military Academy and graduated in 1937. After the revolution of 62 September he held many positions, including the Minister of War in 1962, ambassador of Yemen Arab Republic to United Arab Republic in 1963, Prime Minister in 1964, the Minister of Economy and Treasure, the head of National Defense Council in 1965, and then the Minister of War in 1966.

Literature
Robin Leonard Bidwell: Dictionary of Modern Arab History, page 209. Routledge, New York 2010

References 

1918 births
1985 deaths
Prime Ministers of North Yemen
Economy ministers of Yemen
20th-century Yemeni military personnel
Iraqi Military Academy alumni